Parsons Senior High School is a public secondary school in Parsons, Kansas, United States.  It is operated by Parsons USD 503 school district, and serves students of grades 9 to 12.  It is the sole high school in the school district.  The school colors are blue and gold and the school mascot is "Victor the Viking".  It is a member of the Kansas State High School Activities Association and offers a variety of sports programs. Activities teams compete in the 4A division, except football which competes in the 3A division. Extracurricular activities are also offered in the form of performing arts, school publications, and clubs.

History
In 1882, some of the first high school classes offered at Parsons were held at McKinley School. The first Parsons High School building was built in 1893 and cost $30,000. It was located on the southwest corner of Twenty-sixth and Main Streets. The building served the city in its original capacity for just over 30 years. When the new high school / junior college was built on Main Street in the late 1920s, the old high school become West Junior High School. By the 1950s, voters agreed that a new secondary school should begin construction. In the late 50s, the current Parsons High School building was completed. In 2009, a major renovation project was undertaken for Parsons High School and was completely finished before the start of the fall semester. It gave Parsons High School the modern look that can be observed today.

Academics
Parsons Senior High School has a 93% graduation rate. In addition to this, 77% of graduates continue to post-secondary education. PHS offers outstanding general education classes as well as exceptional CTE programs such as Automotive Technology, Graphic Design, Health Science, Welding and more.

Extracurricular activities

Debate and Forensics
Parsons High School is well-noted for its excellence in debate and forensics, having won several individual and team state championships in both debate and forensics.  Parsons was the first school to win the 4-speaker and 2-speaker state debate championships in the same year, doing so in 1993, the first year that the 2-speaker championships existed. In 1990, PHS became the only school ever to place two students (Ajit Pai and Michael Monninger) in the top four National Forensic League (NFL) point leaders in the same year.  For several years, PHS also led the nation in most NFL All-Americans produced, and had more students amongst the all-time NFL point leaders than any other school from Kansas. Between 1985 and 2019 Parsons has been represented at the National Speech and Debate Tournament 31 out of those 34 years, and was recognized as a 30-year milestone school at the 2018 tournament.  In 2012, Steven Wood, the former debate and forensics coach at Parsons High School was inducted into the National Forensic League Hall of Fame, which is the highest honor for a high school speech and debate coach. While Mark Harris was the coach from 1985 to 1997 the program was particularly successful, winning state championships in 1991, 1993, 1994 and 1995.

Athletics
The Vikings compete in the Southeast Kansas League and are classified as a 4A school. Throughout its history, Parsons has won several state championships in various sports.

Tennis
Parsons Senior High School is well-noted for its excellence in a variety of sports, especially in boys' and girls' tennis. The boys' team has won four state championships in tennis, while the girls' teams has won five.

State Championships

Parsons Senior High School offers the following sports:

Fall
 Football
 Volleyball
 Boys Cross-Country
 Girls Cross-Country
 Girls Golf
 Girls Tennis
 Cheerleading
 Dance Squad
 Marching Band

Winter
 Boys Basketball
 Girls Basketball
 Boys Swimming/Diving
 Wrestling
 Winter Percussion

Spring
 Baseball
 Boys Golf
 Boys Tennis
 Girls Soccer
 Girls Swimming/Diving
 Softball
 Boys Track and Field
 Girls Track and Field

Notable alumni
 Gilbert Baker, civil rights activist and creator of the pride flag
 William Coleman, founder of the Coleman Company, and mayor of Wichita, Kansas
 Pintip Dunn, author of young adult fiction
 Derrel Gofourth, NFL offensive lineman for the Green Bay Packers and San Diego Chargers
 George Harvey, professional football player
 Shaun Hill, NFL quarterback for the San Francisco 49ers, Minnesota Vikings, Los Angeles Rams, and Detroit Lions
 Ajit Pai, former FCC chairman
 Nell Reed, American fashion designer and businesswoman.

See also
 List of high schools in Kansas
 List of unified school districts in Kansas

References

External links
 School Website
 USD 503 School District Boundary Map, KDOT

Public high schools in Kansas
Schools in Labette County, Kansas
1893 establishments in Kansas